is the 24th major single by the Japanese girl idol group AKB48, released on December 7, 2011.

Release history and information 
The AKB48 members participating in the single were determined in the rock-paper-scissors tournament held on September 20, 2011, at Nippon Budokan, so called AKB48 24th Single Senbatsu Janken Taikai. The 16 members from the group who advanced into the semi-final and final rounds of the tournament are those that were featured in this single. From this, the Top 8 were chosen to be the main vocalists while member Mariko Shinoda, who came at first place in the tournament, is in the center position.

The single's title song was announced to be "Ue Kara Mariko" on October 29 at the Flying Get handshake event at Ajinomoto Stadium.

The single was released in 4 versions: Type A, Type K, Type B, and Theater Edition.

It has sold 959,280 copies on its first day and later on sold over 1 million by the end of its first week making it the fourth most successful single from the group to sell over a million.

Concept and artwork 
The name Mariko in "Ue Kara Mariko" ("Mariko from Above", "Mariko from the Top") refers to Mariko Shinoda, the member of the group whom the single will be centered around for the first time, having won the rock-paper-scissors tournament. This is also the first song by the group with a member name in the title. The words "ue kara" ("from above", "from the top") might be seen as referring either to Mariko being the eldest or the tallest in the group, or both.

It was also revealed that title song was originally planned to be "Hashire! Penguin" ("Penguin, Run!") but was changed to fit Mariko Shinoda's image. "Hashire! Penguin" was instead sung by Team 4 and appears only on the Theater Edition of the single.

Track listing

Type A

Type K

Type B

Theater Edition

Members

"Ue Kara Mariko" 
Center: Mariko Shinoda

 Team A: Shizuka Ōya, Haruna Kojima, Mariko Shinoda (#1), Ami Maeda
 Team K: Sayaka Akimoto, Ayaka Umeda, Reina Fujie (#2), Minami Minegishi (#3)
 Team B: Tomomi Kasai, Rie Kitahara, Sumire Satō
 Team 4: Suzuran Yamauchi
 Kenkyūsei: Marina Kobayashi (#4)
 SKE48 Team S: Mizuki Kuwabara
 NMB48 Team N: Yūki Yamaguchi
 NMB48 Kenkyūsei: Ayame Hikawa

Top 8 members are in bold.

"Noël no Yoru" 
 Team A: Aika Ōta, Haruna Kojima, Rino Sashihara, Mariko Shinoda, Aki Takajō, Minami Takahashi, Atsuko Maeda
 Team K: Tomomi Itano, Yūko Ōshima, Minami Minegishi, Sae Miyazawa, Yui Yokoyama
 Team B: Tomomi Kasai, Yuki Kashiwagi, Rie Kitahara, Sumire Satō, Mayu Watanabe
 SKE48 Team S: Jurina Matsui, Rena Matsui
 NMB48 Team N: Sayaka Yamamoto

"Rinjin wa Kizutsukanai" 
sung by Team A
 Team A: Misaki Iwasa, Aika Ōta, Shizuka Ōya, Haruka Katayama, Asuka Kuramochi, Haruna Kojima, Rino Sashihara, Shinoda Mariko, Aki Takajō, Minami Takahashi, Haruka Nakagawa, Chisato Nakata, Sayaka Nakaya, Aika Ōta, Ami Maeda, Natsumi Matsubara

"Zero-sum Taiyō" 
sung by Team K
 Team K: Sayaka Akimoto, Tomomi Itano, Mayumi Uchida, Ayaka Umeda, Yūko Ōshima, Ayaka Kikuchi, Miku Tanabe, Tomomi Nakatsuka, Moeno Nitō, Misato Nonaka, Reina Fujie, Sakiko Matsui, Minami Minegishi, Sae Miyazawa, Yui Yokoyama, Rumi Yonezawa

"Yobisute Fantasy" 
sung by Team B
 Team B: Haruka Ishida, Tomomi Kasai, Yuki Kashiwagi, Rie Kitahara, Kana Kobayashi, Mika Komori, Amina Satō, Sumire Satō, Natsuki Satō, Shihori Suzuki, Mariya Suzuki, Rina Chikano, Natsumi Hirajima, Yuka Masuda, Miho Miyazaki, Mayu Watanabe

"Hashire! Penguin" 
sung by Team 4
 Team 4: Maria Abe, Miori Ichikawa, Anna Iriyama, Haruka Shimazaki, Haruka Shimada, Miyu Takeuchi, Mariya Nagao, Shiori Nakamata, Mariko Nakamura, Suzuran Yamauchi

Oricon Charts

Notes

References

External links 
 "Ue kara Mariko" Type A profile at the King Records website 

2011 singles
AKB48 songs
Songs with lyrics by Yasushi Akimoto
Oricon Weekly number-one singles
Billboard Japan Hot 100 number-one singles
King Records (Japan) singles